Church Point may refer to:

 Church Point, Louisiana, United States
 Church Point, New South Wales, Australia
 Church Point, Nova Scotia, Canada
 Church Point, Virginia Beach, Virginia, United States
 Church Point, Antarctica